William C. Hayward (November 22, 1847 – September 16, 1917) was an American politician, newspaper editor, and businessman.

Biography
Born in Cattaraugus County, New York, Hayward moved with his parents to Dakota County, Minnesota. Eventually, he settled in Garner, Hancock County, Iowa in 1873. Hayward went to Iowa State University. He owned the Hancock Signal newspaper and was postmaster for Garner, Iowa. Hayward then was involved with the banking and railroad businesses. He was also involved with farming and grain trading. in 1886, he moved to Davenport, Iowa. Hayward served on the Davenport School Board. From 1898 to 1907, Hayward served in the Iowa State Senate and was a Republican. From 1907 to 1913, Hayward served as Iowa Secretary of State. Hayward died from a stroke at his home in Davenport, Iowa.

References

1847 births
1917 deaths
People from Cattaraugus County, New York
Politicians from Davenport, Iowa
People from Garner, Iowa
Iowa State University alumni
Businesspeople from Iowa
Editors of Iowa newspapers
Farmers from Iowa
Secretaries of State of Iowa
School board members in Iowa
Republican Party Iowa state senators
Iowa postmasters
Journalists from New York (state)